Graphium empedovana is a species of butterfly of the family Papilionidae, that is found in the Philippines (Balabac, Busuanga, Palawan). The species was first described by Alexander Steven Corbet in 1941.

Sometimes regarded as a subspecies of Graphium codrus and sometimes as conspecific with Graphium empedocles. D'Abrera, 1982: p. 96, places it as subspecies Graphium codrus empedovana.

The larva feeds on Hernandia peltata.

Subspecies
 G. e. empedovana
 G. e. inornatum
 G. e. miurai
 G. e. splendidulum

References

Page, M.G.P & Treadaway, C.G. 2003 Schmetterlinge der Erde, Butterflies of the world Part XVII (17), Papilionidae IX Papilionidae of the Philippine Islands. Edited by Erich Bauer and Thomas Frankenbach Keltern: Goecke & Evers; Canterbury: Hillside Books.

External links
"Graphium empedovana (Corbet, 1941)". Insecta.pro. With images.

Butterflies described in 1941
empedovana
Butterflies of Indochina